Akashdeep Singh (born 2 December 1994) is an Indian professional field hockey player who plays as a forward for Uttar Pradesh Wizards in the Hockey India League and the India hockey team.

Career
Born in Verowal, Tarn Taran, Punjab, Singh started to play hockey in secondary school before joining the Guru Angad Dev Sports Club. He then joined the PAU Hockey Academy in Ludhiana in 2006 before joining the Surjit Hockey Academy in Jalandhar. In 2013, Singh was auctioned to the Delhi Waveriders of the Hockey India League. After three seasons with Delhi, Singh was signed by the Uttar Pradesh Wizards for $84,000.

International
Singh was the captain of the youth India hockey sides and has represented India senior side.  He Played Olympics 2016 in Rio . He made 33 international goals. Singh has represented India in the 2018 Commonwealth Games. At the 2018 Asian Champions Trophy, he was awarded the player of the tournament award.

References

External links
 Akashdeep Singh at Hockey India
 
 
 
 
 

1994 births
Living people
Delhi Waveriders players
Uttar Pradesh Wizards players
Male field hockey forwards
Field hockey players from Punjab, India
Hockey India League players
Field hockey players at the 2016 Summer Olympics
Olympic field hockey players of India
Indian male field hockey players
Field hockey players at the 2014 Commonwealth Games
Field hockey players at the 2018 Commonwealth Games
Field hockey players at the 2022 Commonwealth Games
Commonwealth Games silver medallists for India
Commonwealth Games medallists in field hockey
Asian Games gold medalists for India
Asian Games bronze medalists for India
Asian Games medalists in field hockey
Medalists at the 2014 Asian Games
Medalists at the 2018 Asian Games
Field hockey players at the 2014 Asian Games
Field hockey players at the 2018 Asian Games
2014 Men's Hockey World Cup players
2018 Men's Hockey World Cup players
Recipients of the Arjuna Award
2023 Men's FIH Hockey World Cup players
Medallists at the 2014 Commonwealth Games
Medallists at the 2022 Commonwealth Games